Cannon Building in Fountain Inn, South Carolina is a building built in 1880. It was listed on the National Register of Historic Places in 2005.

References

National Register of Historic Places in Greenville County, South Carolina